Four Acres is a historic home located at Charlottesville, Virginia. It was built in 1910, and is a -story, three-bay, Colonial Revival-style brick dwelling. It sits in a raised basement and has a slate hipped roof.  The front facade features a four-columned, Ionic order portico.

It was listed on the National Register of Historic Places in 1982. In 2016, it was listed for sale for over $10 million.

References

Houses on the National Register of Historic Places in Virginia
Houses completed in 1910
Colonial Revival architecture in Virginia
Houses in Charlottesville, Virginia
National Register of Historic Places in Charlottesville, Virginia